Linguistic demography is the statistical study of languages among all populations. Estimating the number of speakers of a given language is not straightforward, and various estimates may diverge considerably. This is first of all due to the question of defining "language" vs. "dialect". Identification of varieties as a single language or as distinct languages is often based on ethnic, cultural, or political considerations rather than mutual intelligibility. The second difficulty is multilingualism, complicating the definition of "native language". Finally, in many countries, insufficient census data add to the difficulties.

Demolinguistics is a branch of Sociology of language observing linguistic trends as affected by population distribution and redistribution and by the status of societies.

Most spoken languages

The following table compares the estimates of  Comrie (1998) and  Weber (1997) (number of native speakers in millions). Also given are the estimates of SIL Ethnologue (2005). 
Comparing estimates that do not date to the same year is problematic due to the 1.14% per year growth of world population (with significant regional differences).

This table shows that for the world's largest languages, it is impossible to give an estimate of the number of native speakers with a certainty better than maybe 10% or 20% or so.

See also
List of languages by number of native speakers
List of languages by total number of speakers
Abstand and ausbau languages
Autonomous language
Language geography
Languages in censuses
Case studies:
 Language demographics of Quebec
 Language Spoken at Home (U.S. Census)

Notes

Literature
Johanna Nichols, Linguistic Diversity in Space and Time, University of Chicago Press (1992), .
David I. Kertzer and Dominique Arel (eds.), Census and Indentiry : The Politics of Race, Ethnicity, and Language in National Censuses, .
Jacques Pohl, Demolinguistics and Language Problems (1972).
H. Kloss, G. McConnell (eds.), Linguistic Composition of the Nations of the World vol. 2, North America, Quebec (1974–1984).

External links
CIA - The World Factbook
M.Turner compares five language surveys - first language vs total speakers, degree of influence, etc. Plus graphs and charts.
Top 100 languages
Ethnologue
Unicode.org Top Languages by GDP Graphs

Linguistics
Language